Ang Panday is a Philippine Fantasy-action-drama series broadcast by TV5 starring Richard Gutierrez, Jasmine Curtis-Smith, Bangs Garcia and Sam Pinto. It is based on the hit novel written by Carlo J. Caparas. It was aired from February 29, 2016, to June 2, 2016.

Cast

Main cast
Richard Gutierrez as Flavio/Miguel/Juro/Panday
Jasmine Curtis-Smith as Alex
Bangs Garcia as Ida/Venus Virus
Sam Pinto as Steph F. Yambao
Christopher De Leon as Lizardo

Supporting cast
Alonzo Muhlach as Alfonso
Carlos Agassi as Ador/Berdugo
Jack Reid as Mark
Ella Cruz as Phoebe
Ranz Kyle as Joseph 
Ara Mina as Carmen
John Regala as David
Epi Quizon as Ledge
Empoy Marquez as Nilo
Regine Tolentino as Inang Morgana
Bodjie Pascua as Apo Simeon
Andrew Muhlach as Teenage Damian
Fabio Ide as Adult Damian
Menggie Cobarrubias as Old Damian

Extended cast and special participation
Oliver Posadas as Benjie
Tony Mabesa as Padre Lucas
Elvis Gutierrez as Hugo
Rocky Gutierrez as Ramon
Cindy Miranda as Sylvia
CJ Caparas as Anton
Ali Peek as Phantom
Mon Confiado as Amang
Francine Prieto as Rosanna F. Yambao
Raquel Montesa as Tiya Flor

Reception
According to AGB Neilsen, the pilot episode gained 5% national ratings, becoming the most watched show on TV5 Network.

See also
List of programs aired by TV5 (Philippine TV network)
Panday (comics)

References

External links
Official website of TV5 (Philippines)

Panday
2016 Philippine television series debuts
2016 Philippine television series endings
TV5 (Philippine TV network) drama series
Fantaserye and telefantasya
Filipino-language television shows
Philippine action television series
Philippine drama television series
Philippine horror fiction television series
Television shows based on comics
Television series by Viva Television
Television series reboots